Rust is a 2010 drama written and directed by Corbin Bernsen, which was released direct-to-video on October 5, 2010.  The film takes place in the town of Kipling, Saskatchewan, Canada with many local citizens in prominent roles. Rust was inspired by Bernsen's own spiritual journey after his father, Harry Bernsen, died in 2008.

Cast
 Corbin Bernsen as James Moore
 Lloyd Allen Warner as Travis
 Frank Gall as Glen Moore
 Audrey Tennant as Mary
 Kirsten Collins as Amanda (song Could You Imagine in the credits)
 Judith Davies as Mrs. Wexler

References

External links

2010 films
Films directed by Corbin Bernsen
2010 drama films
American drama films
2010s American films